Maria Isabel de Alcântara Bourbon (28 February 1830 – 5 September 1896) was the third daughter (fifth child) of emperor Pedro I of Brazil and his mistress, Domitila de Castro, Marchioness of Santos.
 
Maria Isabel received the same name as her second sister, the Duchess of Ceará, who died in 1828 at only two months old. She was never given any titles by her father due to his marriage to Amélie of Leuchtenberg. Still, Pedro I acknowledged her as his daughter in his will but gave her no share of his state, except asking for his widow to aid in her education and upbringing. He had wished that she be given a good European education like her oldest sister, the Duchess of Goiás. However, the Marchioness declined to send the girl to Europe.

On 2 September 1848, at the age of eighteen, Maria Isabel married Pedro Caldeira Brant, the Count of Iguaçu, son of Felisberto Caldeira Brant, Marquis of Barbacena. At their wedding, Maria Isabel became the second Countess of Iguaçu. The couple had seven children: 
Isabel dos Santos
Luís de Alcantâra Caldeira Brant, married Maria Luísa Pereira de Brito
Pedro de Alcântara Caldeira Brant
Deulinda dos Santos, married Claudiano dos Santos
Maria Teresa Caldeira Brant, married Charles Collins
Isabel Maria dos Santos, married Antônio Dias Paes Leme
José Severiano de Alcântara

She died on 5 September 1896, at sixty-six years of age, in São Paulo.

References

Bibliography

Ancestry

1830 births
1896 deaths
Brazilian nobility
Illegitimate children of Portuguese monarchs
Brazilian people of Austrian descent
Brazilian people of Portuguese descent
19th-century Brazilian people
19th-century Brazilian women
Daughters of emperors
Daughters of kings